The Mandi House Metro Station is located on the Blue Line and Violet Line of the Delhi Metro in Delhi, India. It services the cultural hub of Delhi, the Mandi House area which has the National School of Drama, Ravindra Bhavan, home of Sangeet Natak Akademi and Sahitya Akademi, Shri Ram Centre for Performing Arts and Triveni Kala Sangam, As well as the Bengali Market and the nearby residential areas.

History
As part of Phase III of the extension of Delhi Metro, Mandi House will be expanded into an interchange station in order to reduce pressure on Rajiv Chowk station.  A new 6.8-km line is expected to come up from Central Secretariat to a new station at Kashmiri Gate by the end of 2015. The new line will be developed on standard gauge and integrated with the Badarpur corridor, which too runs on standard gauge.  As the existing Mandi House station has broad-gauge tracks, Metro officials are now working on plans to develop a parallel station at the same site.

Facilities
List of available ATM at Mandi House metro station:Canara Bank

Connections
Mandi House works as interchange station between Blue and Violet line of Delhi Metro.

See also
List of Delhi Metro stations
Transport in Delhi
Delhi Metro Rail Corporation
Delhi Suburban Railway
List of rapid transit systems in India

References

External links

 Delhi Metro Rail Corporation Ltd. (Official site) 
 Delhi Metro Annual Reports
 
 UrbanRail.Net – descriptions of all metro systems in the world, each with a schematic map showing all stations.

Delhi Metro stations
Railway stations opened in 2006
2006 establishments in Delhi
Railway stations in New Delhi district